The Ambassador of Great Britain to France (French: L'Ambassadeur britannique en France) was the foremost diplomatic representative in France of the Kingdom of Great Britain, created by the Treaty of Union in 1707, in charge of the British diplomatic mission in France.

Traditionally, the Embassy to France was the most prestigious posting in the English and later British foreign services, although in the eighteenth century there was sometimes no diplomatic representation between the two countries, due to the wars between them.

For Ambassadors to France before 1707, see List of ambassadors of the Kingdom of England to France.

For Ambassadors to France after 1800, see List of ambassadors from the United Kingdom to France.

Ambassadors and Ministers of Great Britain to France
 No permanent representation of the Kingdom of Great Britain, or of its predecessor the Kingdom of England, to France between 1701 and 1712, due to the War of the Spanish Succession.
 1709: Charles Townshend, Viscount Townshend Plenipotentiary
 1712: The Duke of Hamilton (Never took office, being killed in a celebrated duel before setting off.)
 1712–1715: Matthew Prior, Plenipotentiary 
 1712–1713: The Duke of Shrewsbury 
 1714–1720: The Earl of Stair, Minister-Plenipotentiary 1714–1715; Envoy Extraordinary 1715; then Ambassador
 1720–1721: Sir Robert Sutton, Ambassador 
 1721–1724: Sir Luke Schaub 
 1724–1730: The Lord Walpole of Wolterton Envoy Extraordinary 1724; Ambassador Extraordinary 1724–1727; Ambassador Extraordinary and Plenipotentiary 1727–1730
 1730–1740: The Earl Waldegrave 
 1740–1744: Anthony Thompson, Chargé d'Affaires 
 no representation 1744–1748 due to the War of the Austrian Succession
 1749–1754: The Earl of Albemarle 
 no representation 1754–1762 due to the Seven Years' War
 1761: Hans Stanley, Minister: special mission to negotiate peace
 1762–1763: The Duke of Bedford
 1763–1765: The Earl of Hertford 
 1765–1766: The Duke of Richmond
 1766–1768: The Earl of Rochford 
 1768–1772: The Earl Harcourt
 1772–1778: The Viscount Stormont
 no representation 1778–1782 due to American Revolutionary War
 1782: Thomas Grenville, Minister 
 1782–1783: Alleyne Fitzherbert, Minister Plenipotentiary 
 1783–1784: The Duke of Manchester
 1784–1789: John Frederick Sackville, 3rd Duke of Dorset, Ambassador Extraordinary and Plenipotentiary
 1789–1790: Embassy Secretary Lord Robert Stephen FitzGerald (1765–1833), son of James FitzGerald, 1st Duke of Leinster, acted as Minister Plenipotentiary from 8 August 1789 to 20 June 1790
 1790–1792: Earl Gower, Ambassador Extraordinary and Plenipotentiary 
 No representation after 1792, due to the French Revolutionary Wars. Diplomatic relations were severed until 1801.
 1797: James Harris, Baron Malmesbury, Plenipotentiary

References

France
Great Britain